Daysman may refer to:

The Daysman, a book by Stanley Middleton
Daysman, another word for Adjudicator
Daysman, another name for day labourer

See also
Dayman (disambiguation)